Bhamidipati Sai Praneeth (born 10 August 1992) is an Indian badminton player. He became the first Indian male shuttler in 36 years to win a bronze medal in the BWF World Championships in 2019 after Prakash Padukone in 1983. Sai Praneeth was honoured with the Arjuna Award in 2019. His parents are Seshadri Deekshitulu and Madhavi Latha of Palakollu, West Godavari district, Andhra Pradesh. His maternal aunt was a national level badminton player.

Career 
Sai Praneeth is an India badminton player who currently trains at the Gopichand Badminton Academy in Hyderabad. The right-handed Indian stunned the 2003 All England Champion Muhammad Hafiz Hashim of Malaysia at the 2013 Thailand Open Grand Prix Gold tournament in the first round.

In 2013, Praneeth defeated Taufik Hidayat unexpectedly early in front of a home crowd. He defeated Taufik Hidayat in the first round match of the Djarum Indonesia Open 2013, with the final score being 15-21, 21-12, 21-17. A few days later, on 19 June 2013, he again upstaged a much higher ranked Hu Yun of Hong Kong in the Singapore Super Series.

At the 2016 All England Super Series Premier, Sai Praneeth defeated the 2nd seed Lee Chong Wei of Malaysia in the 1st Round 24-22, 22-20 in straight games. In July 2016, he won his maiden Grand Prix title, the 2016 Canada Open Grand Prix in the men's singles category. In the final match played at Calgary, Sai Praneeth defeated Lee Hyun-il of South Korea 21-12, 21-10. In 2017, he won the Singapore Open Super Series after beating compatriot Srikanth Kidambi in the final in three games, hence becoming the fourth Indian to win a superseries title after Saina Nehwal, Srikanth Kidambi and P. V. Sindhu.

In 2019, Praneeth won a bronze medal at the BWF World Championships in Basel, Switzerland after losing in the semifinals to eventual champion Kento Momota. In his route to the semifinal, he beat sixth seed Anthony Sinisuka Ginting of Indonesia in the third round and the reigning Asian Games Champion Jonatan Christie of Indonesia in the quarterfinals.

Praneeth qualified for the 2020 Tokyo Olympics, where he was seeded thirteenth. However, he made a shock exit at the group stage after losing to Misha Zilberman of Israel and Mark Caljouw of Netherlands.

Achievements

BWF World Championships 
Men's singles

BWF World Junior Championships 
Boys' singles

BWF World Tour (1 runner-up) 
The BWF World Tour, announced on 19 March 2017 and implemented in 2018, is a series of elite badminton tournaments, sanctioned by Badminton World Federation (BWF). The BWF World Tour are divided into six levels, namely World Tour Finals, Super 1000, Super 750, Super 500, Super 300 (part of the HSBC World Tour), and the BWF Tour Super 100.

Men's singles

BWF Superseries (1 title) 
The BWF Superseries, launched on 14 December 2006 and implemented in 2007, was a series of elite badminton tournaments, sanctioned by Badminton World Federation (BWF). BWF Superseries had two levels: Superseries and Superseries Premier. A season of Superseries featured twelve tournaments around the world, which introduced since 2011, with successful players invited to the Superseries Finals held at the year-end.

Men's singles

  BWF Superseries Finals tournament
  BWF Superseries Premier tournament
  BWF Superseries tournament

BWF Grand Prix (2 titles, 1 runner-up) 
The BWF Grand Prix has two levels, the BWF Grand Prix and Grand Prix Gold. It is a series of badminton tournaments sanctioned by the Badminton World Federation (BWF) since 2007.

Men's singles

  BWF Grand Prix Gold tournament
  BWF Grand Prix tournament

BWF International Challenge/Series (6 titles, 1 runner-up) 
Men's singles

Men's doubles

  BWF International Challenge tournament
  BWF International Series tournament

Record against selected opponents 
Record against year-end Finals finalists, World Championships semi-finalists, and Olympic quarter-finalists. Accurate as of 29 November 2022.

References

External links 
 
 
 

1992 births
Living people
Racket sportspeople from Andhra Pradesh
Indian male badminton players
Badminton players at the 2010 Summer Youth Olympics
Badminton players at the 2018 Asian Games
Asian Games competitors for India
South Asian Games gold medalists for India
South Asian Games medalists in badminton
Recipients of the Arjuna Award
Badminton players at the 2020 Summer Olympics
Olympic badminton players of India